James E. Curtin, Arizona politician, state senator
 James Curtin, birth name of Drake Maverick, professional wrestler